Saki-ye Olya (also Romanized as Sākī-ye ‘Olyā and Sakī ‘Olya; also known as Sākī, Sākī Bālā, Sākī-ye Bālā, Shāqi Auliya, and Shāqī-ye ‘Olyā) is a village in Shamsabad Rural District, in the Central District of Arak County, Markazi Province, Iran. At the 2006 census, its population was 128, in 29 families.

References 

Populated places in Arak County